Tazehabad (also Romanized as Tāzehābād) is a village in Harazpey-ye Shomali Rural District, Sorkhrud District, Mahmudabad County, Mazandaran Province, Iran. At the 2006 census, its population was 447, in 119 families.

References 

Populated places in Mahmudabad County